Artemi Yevgenyevich Maleyev (born 4 May 1991) is a Russian football midfielder who plays for FC Novosibirsk.

Club career
He made his professional debut for FC KAMAZ Naberezhnye Chelny on 12 September 2011 in a Russian Football National League game against FC Dynamo Bryansk.

References

1991 births
Sportspeople from Omsk
Living people
Russian footballers
Russia youth international footballers
Association football midfielders
FC Spartak Moscow players
FC KAMAZ Naberezhnye Chelny players
FC Tyumen players
FC Avangard Kursk players
FC Neftekhimik Nizhnekamsk players
FC Baltika Kaliningrad players
FK Spartaks Jūrmala players
FC SKA-Khabarovsk players
Russian First League players
Russian Second League players
Latvian Higher League players
Russian expatriate footballers
Expatriate footballers in Latvia
Russian expatriate sportspeople in Latvia